Gerald Bostock may refer to:
 A fictional character mentioned in the album packaging of the Jethro Tull album Thick as a Brick
 The plaintiff in the landmark United States Supreme Court case Bostock v. Clayton County, Georgia